Manatee County courthouse{s} may refer to:

 Old Manatee County Courthouse, Bradenton, Florida, the first courthouse
 Manatee County Courthouse, (Pine Level, Florida) (now in DeSoto County, Florida), the second courthouse, (destroyed)
 Manatee County Courthouse, Bradenton, Florida, the third and present courthouse